Red Foster may refer to:

Red Foster (baseball), American baseball player
Red Foster (humanitarian) (1905–1985), Canadian humanitarian
Red Dawn Foster, American politician

See also
Reddy Foster (1864–1908), American baseball player